Revolutionary Democratic Action (in Spanish: Acción Democrática Revolucionaria), was a political party in Peru, active in the 1950s. Its president was Carlos Guija.

References

Defunct political parties in Peru
Political parties with year of disestablishment missing
Political parties with year of establishment missing